Oye Makhna (transl. My Sweetheart) is a Punjabi romantic–comedy film made under the Saregama Label. Film is directed by Simerjit Singh, the movie stars Ammy Virk, Tania, Guggu Gill and Sidhika Sharma. The film was released on 4 November 2022.

Plot
When Makhan falls in love with a girl by just looking at her eyes, he and his uncle go to hilarious lengths to set him up with her. However, things take a chaotic turn when they find out that they`ve actually fixed up his wedding with the wrong girl. As the pressure to clear out the confusion mounts, the very integrity of their family is threatened. Will Makhan find a way to be with the girl of his dreams?

Cast
 Ammy Virk as Makhan Virk
 Tania as Rimple
 Guggu Gill as Shinda
 Sidhika Sharma as Guddi
 Hardeep Gill
 Tarsem Paul
 Satwant Kaur
 Sukhwinder Chahal as Harnek Singh
 Deedar Gill
 Parminder Gill
 Manju Mahal
 Rose J. Kaur
 Sapna Choudhary as Dancer in song "Chad Gayi Chad Gayi"

Release
The film was originally set to release on 9 September 2022, but got pushed to 4 November 2022 with a schedule of worldwide release.

Music
The music of the film is composed by Avvy Sra, Gaurav Dev, Kartik Dev and duo of Salim–Sulaiman. The background score is composed by the duo of Inder Bawra and Sunny Bawra.

References

External Links

Punjabi-language Indian films
Films directed by Simerjit Singh